A constitutional referendum was held in Liberia on 8 December 2020 alongside Senate elections and two by-elections to the House of Representatives. It had been planned for 13 October, but was postponed due to the COVID-19 pandemic. Voters were asked whether they approved of eight amendments to the constitution, voting separately on each one. Although a majority of valid votes were in favour for each proposal, the two-thirds quorum was not met for any proposal.

Background
The government had planned to bundle the eight amendments into three questions, with one question on amending article 28 (citizenship), one on amending articles 45, 47, 48, 49 and 50 on the terms of office of the President, Senate and House of Representatives, and one on amending article 83 to change the date of general elections and decrease the time the Elections Commission has to investigate complaints. However, this was ruled unconstitutional by the Supreme Court, as article 92 requires amendments to be voted on separately. This was taken by many to mean the referendum was cancelled. However, Solicitor-General Syrenius Cephus claimed the ruling meant that if the questions were unbundled, the referendum could go ahead. The National Elections Commission subsequently began printing new ballot papers with the amendments separated out.
 
The opposition Collaborating Political Parties attempted to appeal to the Supreme Court, but were unsuccessful. Despite reports the changes would lead to George Weah's third presidential term like in other Western African neighbors, Weah denied the move.

Proposed amendments
Article 28: Amend the constitutional rights of citizenship. Citizenship is granted automatically if both parents were Liberian citizens at the time of their birth; the amendments proposed require only one parent to be a Liberian citizen, removes the ability of the government to legislate to remove citizenship of natural born citizens and prohibits citizens with dual citizenship from holding senior positions, including justices of the Supreme Court, ministerial positions, heads of government agencies, ambassadorships and the chief of staff and deputy chief of staff of the military.
Article 45: Reducing Senators' terms from nine to seven years 
Article 47: Reducing the term of the President of the Senate from six to five years
Article 48: Reducing the term of the House of Representatives from six to five years.
Article 49: Reducing the term of the Speaker of the House of Representatives from six to five years
Article 50: Reducing the term of the President from six to five years
Article 83: Change the date of general elections from the second Tuesday in October to the second Tuesday in November to avoid the rainy season
Article 83: Decrease the time the Elections Commission has to investigate complaints from thirty to fifteen days

Results
Partial results coming from the third of country's regions showed that the amendments on reducing the term of presidency and allowing dual citizenship won a majority of votes. According to National Election Commission, voters said yes to all eight questions asked on the referendum in five of fifteen counties in the country. Final results were released on 1 April 2021, with a narrow majority in favour of all eight proposals, but none meeting the two-thirds quorum required, resulting in all proposals being rejected.

References

External links
Liberia, 8. Dezember 2020 : Doppelte Staatsangehörigkeit Direct Democracy

Liberia
2020 in Liberia
Referendums in Liberia
Liberia